Jonas Bokeloh (born 16 March 1996) is a German former professional road cyclist, who rode professionally between 2015 and 2019. He became junior world champion in 2014, winning in a bunch sprint finish. He had also won the German junior championship as well as the junior race of Rund um Köln the same year. In 2016, he won the 1.2 rated race Trofej Umag in Croatia.

Major results

2014
 1st  Road race, UCI Junior Road World Championships
 1st  Road race, National Junior Road Championships
2015
 9th Fyen Rundt
2016
 1st Trofej Umag
 4th Poreč Trophy
2017
 1st Grote Prijs Beeckman-De Caluwé
2018
 4th Trofej Umag

References

External links

1996 births
German male cyclists
Living people
Cyclists from Frankfurt